Milliken Creek may refer to:

Milliken Creek (California), a stream in Napa County, United States
Milliken Creek (Minnesota), a stream in Dodge County, United States